Banc-y-Warren is hill in Ceredigion with a height of 146 m. It is also classed as a Site of Special Scientific Interest.

See also
List of Sites of Special Scientific Interest in Ceredigion

References

Sites of Special Scientific Interest in Ceredigion
Mountains and hills of Ceredigion